Ian Berry may refer to:

 Ian Berry (photojournalist) (born 1934), British photojournalist in South Africa
 Ian Berry (politician) (born 1951), Australian Liberal National politician
 Ian Berry (born 1984), artist in Great Britain who has worked under the pseudonym Denimu